Oxaceprol is an anti-inflammatory drug used in the treatment of osteoarthritis. It is derived from L-proline, a DNA-encoded amino acid. The active effect of Oxaceprol is to inhibit the adhesion and migration of white blood cells.

References

External links 
 

Pyrrolidines
Acetamides
Secondary alcohols
Amino acid derivatives